Verigar was the first postage stamp series of the State of Slovenes, Croats and Serbs, issued in Slovenia after the dissolution of the Austro-Hungarian monarchy at the end of World War I. The name of the stamp series is derived from the Slovene word veriga, meaning 'chain', and depicts a slave who has broken the chains. The scene symbolizes the freedom of the Slavic peoples from Austria-Hungary. It was designed by the academy-trained painter Ivan Vavpotič, whose model was the gymnast Stane Derganc.

Description
The stamp design includes the abbreviated name of the State of Slovenes, Croats and Serbs written in Serbian Cyrillic and Gaj’s Latin script ("Држава СХС" - "Država SHS"). The stamp design also includes an image that represents a man who has broken the chains enslaving him; he stands in front of a rising sun.

History
The first stamps of the series were designed in the late 1918 in Ljubljana during the short-lived State of Slovenes, Croats and Serbs and issued on 3 January 1919 after the creation of the Kingdom of Serbs, Croats and Slovenes. They were then published in different versions until 1920. In 1925, Vavpotič regretted the choice of the motif because he found it kitschy.

Commemoration
On 19 March 1993, the Slovenian post office issued a new stamp series using the Verigar man to commemorate its 75th anniversary. Another commemorative stamp was published on the 90th anniversary of the series in 2009.

See also
Postage stamps and postal history of Yugoslavia

References

Philately of Croatia
Postage stamps of Slovenia
Postal history of Slovenia
1918 drawings
Slavery in art
Kingdom of Yugoslavia